Āfareaitu is an associated commune on the island of Moorea, in French Polynesia. It is part of the commune Moorea-Maiao. According to a census in 2012, it had a population of 3,455 people. According to the 2017 census, it had grown to a population of 3,674 people.

References

Populated places in the Society Islands
Mo'orea